Aquilegia ottonis is a species of flowering plant in the buttercup family. It has a broad distribution in Europe; it is native to Greece, Italy, and Albania. Plants produce blue-purple flowers which, based on pollination syndromes, are thought to be pollinated by bumblebees. A. ottonis is named after King Otto of Greece; the specific epithet 'ottonis' is the third declension of 'otto'.

Taxonomy
A. ottonis comprises three subspecies:

 A. ottonis subsp. amaliae (Heldr. ex Boiss.) Strid (syn. A. amaliae Heldr. ex Boiss.; A. ottonis var. amaliae (Heldr.) Rapaics; A. vulgaris var. amaliae (Heldr.) Brühl), which grows on rocky outcrops, and produces flowers with white petals and blue sepals. It was originally named after Queen Amalia of Greece.
 A. ottonis subsp. ottonis Boiss. (syn. A. ottonis subsp. australis Quézel & Contandr.; A. ottonis subsp. meridionalis Quézel & Contandr.; A. ottonis subsp. ottonis var. unguisepala Borbás), which can be found in the vicinity of Mounts Chelmos, Giona, and Parnassus. Under IUCN criteria, it is considered vulnerable to extinction in Greece.
 A. ottonis subsp. taygetea (Orph.) Strid (syn. A. amaliae var. taygetea (Orph.) Hayek; A. taygetea Orph.), which is endemic to Mount Taygetos in Greece. It is considered vulnerable to extinction, and is protected under the Convention on the Conservation of European Wildlife and Natural Habitats.

Notes

References

Further reading 
 
 
 
 

ottonis
Flora of Greece